Doležal (feminine Doležalová) is a Czech family name, becoming Dolezal, or Doleschal in German. It may refer to:

People 
 Bogumir Doležal (1889–1959), Croatian sportsman and journalist
 Bohumil Doležal (born 1940), Czech literary critic, politician
 Carl Ludwig Doleschall (also Doleschal) (1827–1859), Hungarian surgeon
 Christian Doleschal (born 1988), German lawyer and politician
 Dominik Doleschal (born 1989), Austrian footballer
 František Doležal (born 1913), Czech boxer
Greg Dolezal, American politician
 Josef Doležal (1920-1990), Czech athlete
 Jiří Doležal (born 1985), Czech ice hockey player
 Marie Doležalová (born 1987), Czech actress
 Martin Doležal (born 1980), Czech footballer
 Martin Doležal (born 1990), Czech footballer
 Michal Doležal (born 1977), Czech footballer
 Michal Doležal (born 1978), Czech ski jumper
 Nikolay Dollezhal (Доллежаль) (1899–2000), Soviet mechanical engineer
 Rachel Dolezal (born 1977), American civil rights activist
 Riley Dolezal (born 1985), American javelin thrower
 Rudi Dolezal (born 1958), Austrian film director and film producer
 Rudolf Doležal (1916-2002), Czech sculptor, medalist
 Sanja Doležal (born 1963), Croatian singer
 Tomáš Doležal (born 1990), Czech ice hockey player
 Zdeněk Doležal (born 1931), Czech pair skater
 Zuzana Doležalová (born 1980), Czech snowboarder

See also
 5884 Dolezal (6045 P-L), a Main-belt asteroid
 

Czech-language surnames
German-language surnames